The West Indian cricket team toured England from 12 May to 7 July 2007 as part of the 2007 English cricket season. The tour included four Tests, two Twenty20 international matches and three One Day Internationals. While England dominated the Test series 3–0, including a record victory over the West Indies, the latter took the ODI series 2:1.

Comparative performances

Test matches
In the ICC Test Championship, England are ranked second and West Indies are ranked eighth, though England's most recent series was a whitewash loss in the Ashes against Australia for the first time since 1921, their first Test series loss since their tour of Pakistan in 2005. West Indies, meanwhile, lost 2–0 to Pakistan in November 2006 as their last Test series, and have not won a Test since April 2005. The last time West Indies won an away Test to a nation currently ranked above them was on their tour of England in 2000 – they also beat Zimbabwe and Bangladesh twice during the intervening seven years.

One-Day Internationals
The ICC ODI Championship sees England ranked just ahead of West Indies, as seventh and eighth respectively, though West Indies are more competitive in ODIs. They finished fifth and sixth in the Super Eight stage of the recent World Cup, with England finishing ahead of West Indies by virtue of their one-wicket win. West Indies, however, reached the final of the Champions Trophy in October 2006, and defeated India 4–1 in a home series in May. England also acquired one ODI series win in the past year, defeating Australia in the final of the 2007 Commonwealth Bank Series, their first series win abroad since 1998. They were, however, defeated 0–5 at home by Sri Lanka in June, as well as drawing 2–2 with Pakistan.

Squads
This was Peter Moores' first series as England Coach, and Andy Flower, former Zimbabwe wicket-keeper batsman, was his newly appointed assistant. Michael Vaughan had been set to return to Test cricket for his first match in 17 months after captaining England during the World Cup, but an injury to his finger ruled him out of the first Test, and Andrew Strauss was appointed as captain in his place. James Anderson was a late addition to the squad as cover for Andrew Flintoff, though neither eventually played the first Test. Flintoff was also ruled out of playing in the second Test, despite having been named in the squads for both of the first two Tests.

During the first Test Matthew Hoggard suffered an injury, and took no further part in the match after the first West Indian innings, and he was also ruled out of playing in the second Test. His replacement was Ryan Sidebottom, recalled six years after his only previous Test, while Vaughan returned from injury as captain. Owais Shah was dropped to make way for Vaughan. Hoggard was called back to the England squad for the fourth and final Test at Chester-le-Street pending his fitness, while Liam Plunkett was dropped.

During the Fourth Test, Vaughan abruptly announced his resignation from the one-day captaincy, and was replaced by Paul Collingwood. The subsequent squad announcement then saw Vaughan and out-of-form Andrew Strauss dropped in favour of Jonathan Trott and Dimitri Mascarenhas.

For West Indies, Brian Lara had retired from all cricket at the end of the World Cup, and Ramnaresh Sarwan replaced him as captain for this series. Lendl Simmons had been dropped since the tour of Pakistan, and Devon Smith and Sylvester Joseph entered the squad as specialist batsmen. Spinners Omari Banks and Dave Mohammed had been left out for seamers Ravi Rampaul and Darren Sammy.

Sarwan injured his collarbone during the second Test at Headingley, ruling him out of the remainder of the tour. Marlon Samuels was called up as his replacement, while Daren Ganga was named stand-in captain for the remainder of the Test series. There was speculation that the selectors named Chris Gayle as captain of the ODI squad, only for the West Indies Cricket Board to reject the decision and asked the selectors to include Daren Ganga as captain instead.

In the end, Gayle was chosen as one-day captain, with Shivnarine Chanderpaul assuming vice-captaincy duties. Also, one-day specialists Austin Richards, Dwayne Smith and a recalled Simmons were called in to replace Joseph, Ganga and Corey Collymore.

Test series

1st Test

2nd Test

This was West Indies' heaviest defeat in Test cricket. The fourth day was played with the temperature around seven degrees Celsius in the morning; the coldest playing conditions for a Test in England.

3rd Test

England, looking to take an unassailable lead in the series, batted first, sending Andrew Strauss and Alastair Cook to the wicket, but Strauss was dismissed in single figures, his fourteenth innings without making it past 50, plumb lbw by Jerome Taylor. Captain Michael Vaughan joined Cook and held the fence until lunch, with Cook reaching the fifty just before the end of the session with the total on the 112.

Twelve overs after lunch yielded three wickets and 20 runs. Vaughan, seeking centuries in successive Test matches for the first time since the 2002–03 Ashes, was clean bowled for 42 by Corey Collymore, Kevin Pietersen was caught by Bravo off Collymore, while Cook was bowled by debutant Darren Sammy. Paul Collingwood met with Ian Bell for the fifth-wicket partnership, though Bell was the dominant partner as the two made 32 in twelve overs before Taylor struck to leave England at 166 for five. However, the last five provided more than the top five, largely due to Ian Bell who made 97, three short of his seventh Test century, leaving him with a batting average of 84 batting at six in Test cricket. The tenth-wicket also did better than their batting averages would suggest, with Monty Panesar and Ryan Sidebottom both passing 14 in a 32-run partnership before Fidel Edwards bowled Panesar. Extras, with 47, was the third-highest scorer behind Bell and Cook.

With just three overs before lunch, the West Indies made six runs in the first over before an unpredictable over from Steve Harmison, who conceded six runs with wides before delivering his first legal delivery of the Test. However, in a 9-ball over, he did get Daren Ganga out lbw for 6. During the lunch break, West Indies lodged a complaint against Harmison who had unwittingly contravened Law 17 by practising on the match strip before the innings. The complaint was denied 

Harmison conceded 15 more runs, as well as six byes and two leg-byes, in three overs after lunch, but Liam Plunkett struck with his third ball and West Indies were two down for 49. Devon Smith, Runako Morton, Shiv Chanderpaul and Dwayne Bravo all provided passed 20 runs, with Smith and Chanderpaul having the staying power to bat more than an hour, and at 216 for four West Indies were 56 ahead of the English score at the fall of the fifth wicket. However, in the space of 43 balls West Indies lost six wickets, with Ryan Sidebottom and Monty Panesar splitting them evenly and conceding 13 runs in the process. Once again, extras was a near-top-scorer, only eight runs short of Chanderpaul's 50.

Andrew Strauss failed to proved himself again with a second ball lbw, falling for successive double-digit scores for the first time in 35 Test matches, leaving No. 3 Vaughan to effectively open once more. With the total on 28, and both batsmen with two fours to their name, Denesh Ramdin threw up the ball after an appeal off Cook, who scurried for a single in the confusion. Cook was awarded a run, though as the ball hadn't hit bat and he wasn't caught behind, it was eventually a bye. Then, Ramdin let slip a sitter through his legs which went on to hit his helmet, boosting the English with a mandatory five penalty runs before the second day's play ended.

England, having achieved a lead of 141 on first innings, pushed onwards on the third day, losing one wicket in each of the first two sessions, though they had the benefit of West Indies' fielding being between "amateurish and abysmal" according to Cricinfo journalist Andrew McGlashan. Vaughan fell in the forties once again, a return catch for Darren Sammy's second Test wicket, while Kevin Pietersen fell to a bizarre dismissal when West Indian all-rounder Dwayne Bravo delivered a 70 mph bouncer, knocking off Pietersen's helmet which fell onto the stumps, leaving Pietersen out hit wicket. After tea, Gayle broke through to have Cook lbw for 106, before Sammy took six wickets in a seven-over spell to end with figures of seven for 66, the second best by a West Indies bowler on debut, and the best by a debutant in 57 years. Among the wickets was Bell's for two, causing his average at six to drop between 75. The fourth innings had only 8 overs in which Gayle scored a quick four, but Harmison continued the Test's string of early dismissals trapping Ganga plumb for a duck. This didn't stop the West Indies attacking to their target of 455 as 3 more fours were hit, despite two massive appeals from Panesar. The Windies batted slowly and carefully over the two days and ended up falling only 61 runs short of winning the match. If they had reached the total it would have been the highest fourth innings total ever to win a Test match. Shivnarine Chanderpaul top scored with 116 not out.

4th Test

T20I series

1st T20I

2nd T20I

ODI series

1st ODI

Fidel Edwards claimed his second ODI 5-wicket haul; the 8th ODI 5-wicket haul at Lord's.

2nd ODI
{{Single-innings cricket match
| date = 4 July
| team1 = 
| score1 = 278/5 (50 overs)
| score2 = 217 (46 overs)
| team2 = 
| runs1 = Shivnarine Chanderpaul 116* (122)
| wickets1 = Stuart Broad 2/49 (10 overs)
| runs2 = Matt Prior 52 (73)
| wickets2 = Ravi Rampaul 4/41 (10 overs)
| result = West Indies won by 61 runs
| report = Scorecard
| venue = Edgbaston Cricket Ground, Birmingham
| umpires = Brian Jerling (SA) and Nigel Llong (Eng)
| motm = Shivnarine Chanderpaul (WI)
| toss = England won the toss and elected to field.
| rain = Play stopped after 33 overs in West Indies innings due to rain.
Play stopped after 14 overs and after 40 overs in England's innings due to rain.
}}

3rd ODI

England started well getting the early wicket of Devon Smith in the third over, but a good partnership between Chris Gayle and Shivnarine Chanderpaul, producing a second-wicket partnership of 77 gave West Indies a strong platform. England then got two quick wickets of Chanderpaul and Samuels in the space of 15 deliveries to put the game in the balance. West Indies solidified their position, however, with Runako Morton and Chris Gayle putting on 85 for the fourth wicket. Quick batting from Dwayne Bravo (42 runs from 24 balls) ensured that the West Indies set a good score of 289/5 at the end of the innings and England needed 290 runs to win.

Tour matches
West Indians v Somerset

West Indians v Marylebone Cricket Club

West Indians v England Lions

West Indians v Derbyshire

West Indians v PCA Masters XI

West Indies in Ireland

Following the completion of their tour to England, the West Indies will play in a Four-Nations ODI tournament in Ireland, where they will play One Day Internationals against the hosts, the Netherlands and Scotland.

Records
 When five English batsmen recorded centuries during the 1st Test at Lords, it was the first time that this had taken place since 1938.
 Matt Prior's debut score of 126 was the first time an English wicket-keeper had scored a century on his début.
 England's win in the second Test by an innings and 283 runs was the West Indies' heaviest defeat in Test cricket.
 The fourth day of the second Test was played with the temperature around seven degrees Celsius in the morning; the coldest playing conditions for a Test in England.
 Play on the fourth day of the third Test saw the highest number of extras in a Test match in England, and the second highest ever. By the end of the Test, poor fielding by the West Indies and inconsistent bowling by both sides had added 167 to the cumulative run total, which included 51 byes, 45 leg byes, 27 no-balls and 29 wides.
With England's defeat of the West Indies in the third Test, Michael Vaughan became the most successful England Test captain, having won 21 out of 35 the Test matches in which he has led his team.
Shivnarine Chanderpaul ended the three test series with an average of 148.66, surpassing Donald Bradman's average of 126.50 set in 1930, to set a new record for the highest average by an overseas player during a tour of England.

References
 Playfair Cricket Annual Wisden Cricketers Almanack'' (annual)

External links
 CricketArchive: West Indies in England
 Cricinfo: West Indies in England

Notes

2007 in English cricket
2007
International cricket competitions in 2007